Marin County Free Library is a medium-sized public library system that serves the unincorporated areas of Marin County, as well as municipalities in the County that are not served by a city-run public library. The library administration is located in Room 414 in the Marin County Civic Center at 3501 Civic Center Drive, San Rafael, California, United States.

History
The Marin County Free Library was established in 1926 by the county's Board of Supervisors. In 1927, Muriel Wright opened its first branch in the basement of what was at the time the County Courthouse in San Rafael.

Funding
The library is funded predominantly by a parcel tax levied on properties within its jurisdiction.

Branches
The Marin County Free Library serves two core communities in Marin County. The eastern half of the county is heavily developed and branches in the area are typically larger and serve incorporated communities. The western half of the county, West Marin, is largely rural, and the branches in the region are smaller and serve predominantly unincorporated communities. The West Marin branches are administered jointly by a single manager.

East Marin

 Civic Center Branch (San Rafael)
 Located in Room 427 of the Marin County Civic Center Building
 Corte Madera Branch (Corte Madera)
 Fairfax Branch (Fairfax)
 Marin City Branch (Marin City, Unincorporated area)
 Novato Branch (Novato)
 South Novato Branch (Novato)

West Marin
 Bolinas Branch (Unincorporated area)
 Inverness Branch (Unincorporated area)
 Point Reyes Branch (Unincorporated area)
 Stinson Beach Branch (Unincorporated area)

See also

 Belvedere Tiburon Library
 Sausalito Library

References

External links
 Marin County Free Library

Free Library
Marin